Persuader is the name for three unrelated supervillains appearing in comic books published by DC Comics.

Publication history
The Nyeun Chun Ti version of Persuader first appeared in Adventure Comics #352 (January 1967), and was created by Jim Shooter and Curt Swan.

The Cole Parker version of Persuader first appeared in The Adventures of Superman #598 (January 2002), and was created by Joe Casey and Pete Woods.

The Elise Kimble version of Persuader first appeared in Teen Titans (vol. 3) #56 (April, 2008) and was created by Sean McKeever and Eddy Barrows.

Fictional character biography

Nyeun Chun Ti
The Persuader was one of five outlaws recruited by the Legion of Super-Heroes to help them combat the Sun-Eater in exchange for amnesty for their crimes. The villains later turned on the Legion and formed the Fatal Five, becoming one of the Legion's most notable threats. The Persuader wielded an "atomic axe" on a long shaft, resembling a halberd. This axe could reportedly cut through anything, occasionally including purely metaphoric or intangible things, such as a person's air supply, the force of gravity, or the separation between dimensions, and followed the Persuader's mental commands.

The Persuader came from a heavy-gravity planet; as a result, all of his physical capabilities such as strength and endurance are greatly enhanced. Before becoming a supervillain, he was a gangland enforcer who gained his name from his ability to thoroughly intimidate his victims.

He was relatively unchanged following the Legion Reboot. In the Teen Titans/Legion crossover that ended the Reboot Legion, the Persuader had used his axe to cut through Hypertime, thereby teaming Fatal Fives from various universes as the Fatal Five Hundred. He had a daughter that visited him while he was in prison.

The Persuader did not appear in the Threeboot Legion continuity.

During Final Crisis: Legion of 3 Worlds, the original Persuader (alongside the other Fatal Five members) was among the supervillains in Superboy-Prime's Legion of Super-Villains.

Cole Parker
Cole Parker was a factory worker who had lost his job in the wake of the Brainiac-13 upgrade and blamed the Daily Planet. Inspired by images of Superman fighting a holographic Fatal Five, he led a fire-axe wielding riot against the Planet (the "Cult of Persuasion") and was imprisoned.

A mysterious stranger appeared in Cole's cell and gave him an Atomic Axe to help him fulfill his need for vengeance. He escaped prison and fought Superman, but in the midst of battle a miscalculation with the Axe opened an interdimensional portal, through which the Persuader was cast. The Mxyzptlk Twins decide to rewrite history so it was they who supplied the axe.

During a mission with the Suicide Squad, Parker was accidentally killed by teen hero Osiris when Osiris flew directly through Parker's body to save his sister Isis.

Elise Kimble
Elise Kimble has appeared as a member of Clock King's Terror Titans. According to Terror Titans #1, Clock King has told her that she is supposedly an ancestor of the original Persuader of the 31st Century. She wears the same mask as the other Persuaders, and likewise carries an atomic axe, her weapon of choice. Her atomic axe cuts objects on a molecular level, allowing her to cleanly shear flesh, bone, steel, wood and any other object except for Ravager's energy swords.

According to Terror Titans #3, Elise's father left when she was a little girl. Growing up with a spiteful mother turned her cold, and she became an assassin-for-hire while still in high school, eventually committing matricide when her mother found out. She joined up with Clock King to find her father. Clock King located and brought Elise's father to her, only to kill him in the midst of their reunion, so as to toughen her up. Along with the other surviving Terror Titans, Elise is defeated and turned over to the authorities after the teen metahumans held captive in the Dark Side Club are freed by Ravager and Miss Martian. While being transported by the police, the Terror Titans escape and flee to parts unknown.

Elise reappears in Teen Titans #98 as part of Superboy-Prime's Legion of Doom. While battling Rose Wilson, Elise taunts her and claims that she must have an ulterior motive for joining the Teen Titans. Elise is ultimately defeated after being shot with an arrow by Speedy, allowing Rose to knock her out.

Powers and abilities
Each of the Persuaders have enhanced physical capabilities.

Equipment
The Nyeun Chun Ti version of Persuader has an Atomic axe that can cut through anything.

The Elise Kimble version of Persuader has an atomic axe that can cut objects on a molecular level, allowing her to cleanly shear flesh, bone, steel, wood and any other object except for Ravager's energy swords.

In other media

Television

 The Persuader appears in the Justice League Unlimited episode "Far From Home", voiced by an uncredited Kin Shriner. His first appearance in the episode, alongside Emerald Empress, references their relationship in the original Legion continuity following Tharok's death, and is also reminiscent of Marvel Comics characters Enchantress and Executioner.
 The Persuader appears in the Legion of Super Heroes episode "Who Am I?", voiced by David Sobolov.
 The Persuader appears in the Smallville episode "Legion", portrayed by uncredited stunt performer Fraser Aitcheson. This version is a xenophobe and part of the future "human supremacist" movement. He steals a Legion flight ring, travels through time and attempts to kill Clark Kent before he can become Superman and inspire the Legion's creation. Clark is ultimately saved by Cosmic Boy, Saturn Girl, and Lightning Lad, who remove Persuader's Legion ring and send him back to the future.

Film
 Persuader appears in the DC Universe Original Movie Justice League vs. the Fatal Five, voiced by Matthew Yang King.

References

Articles about multiple fictional characters
DC Comics characters with superhuman strength
DC Comics supervillains
DC Comics male supervillains
DC Comics female supervillains
DC Comics martial artists
Comics characters introduced in 1967
Comics characters introduced in 2002
Comics characters introduced in 2008
Characters created by Curt Swan
Characters created by Jim Shooter
Fictional axefighters
Fictional outlaws
Fictional assassins in comics
Fictional matricides